Abraxas expectata is a species of moth belonging to the family Geometridae. It was described by Warren in 1902. It is known from Australia.

References

Abraxini
Moths of Australia
Moths described in 1902